Pingel is a word in Middle Low German which means "little bell" or alternatively a "fussy person". It is also the surname of various people:

 Frank Pingel (1964–), Danish footballer
 John Pingel (1916–1999), American footballer
 John L. Pingel (1834–1923), American farmer, businessman and politician
 Rolf Pingel (1913–2000), German Second World War fighter pilot
 Scott Pingel, American bassist
 Scott Pingel (American football), former American football wide receiver and high school football coach